The city and county of Swansea covers, in addition to the port city of Swansea, areas of upland to the north, and the Gower peninsula to the west. It is on Gower that the earliest scheduled monuments are found. Three sites have evidence of habitation from the Paleolithic, a time before the last ice age. These include the oldest rock painting in Britain and the earliest known burial in Western Europe. There are in total 124 scheduled sites. Prehistoric sites of many sorts are found, particularly on Gower. 64 pre-historic sites are from Paleolithic to Iron Age dates, and include caves, burial mounds and tombs, cairns, defensive enclosures, hillforts and promentary forts. Roman and early medieval sites, by contrast are scarce. The post-Norman Medieval period, by contrast, has  26 sites, 17 of them castles or other defensive monuments. The other nine are all ecclesiastical monuments. The 26 post-medieval monuments are more diverse, including industrial and maritime sites, but also leats, quarries, a mill and even an observatory and an orchid house.  All of the Swansea administrative area lies within the historic county of Glamorgan.

Scheduled monuments have statutory protection. It is illegal to disturb the ground surface or any standing remains. The compilation of the list is undertaken by Cadw Welsh Historic Monuments, which is an executive agency of the National Assembly of Wales. The list of scheduled monuments below is supplied by Cadw with additional material from RCAHMW and Glamorgan-Gwent Archaeological Trust.

Scheduled monuments in Swansea

See also
List of Cadw properties
List of castles in Wales
List of hill forts in Wales
Historic houses in Wales
List of monastic houses in Wales
List of museums in Wales
List of Roman villas in Wales

References
Coflein is the online database of RCAHMW: Royal Commission on the Ancient and Historical Monuments of Wales, GGAT is the Glamorgan-Gwent Archaeological Trust, Cadw is the Welsh Historic Monuments Agency

Swansea
Scheduled
Archaeological sites in Swansea